Matleb (also Romanized as Maṭleb) is a village in Shavur Rural District, Shavur District, Shush County, Khuzestan Province, Iran. At the 2006 census, its population was 22, in 4 families.

References 

Populated places in Shush County